Somewhere in the Night is the fourth studio album by American country music band Sawyer Brown. Its title track was a single, as were "This Missin' You Heart of Mine" and "Old Photographs". All three singles charted on the Hot Country Singles charts. The title track, which is not related to Barry Manilow's hit song, was previously recorded by The Oak Ridge Boys on their 1981 album, Fancy Free.  "Lola's Love" would later be covered by Ricky Van Shelton on his album Love and Honor and released as a single in 1994.

Track listing

Personnel 
As listed in liner notes.

Sawyer Brown
 Mark Miller – lead vocals 
 Gregg Hubbard – keyboards, vocals 
 Bobby Randall – lead guitars, vocals 
 Jim Scholten – bass, vocals 
 Joe Smyth – drums, vocals 

Additional musicians
 David Briggs – keyboards
 Steve Nathan – keyboards
 Jimmy Johnson – electric guitar
 Mac McAnally – acoustic guitar
 Brent Rowan – lead guitars, acoustic guitar, dobro
 David Hood – bass 
 Roger Hawkins – drums
 Terry McMillan – harmonica, percussion
 Jim Horn – saxophones 
 Andrew Love – saxophones
 Jack Hale – trombone
 Wayne Jackson – trumpet

Production 
 Ron Chancey – producer 
 Les Ladd – recording, mixing 
 John Abbott – assistant engineer 
 Pete Greene – assistant engineer 
 Greg Parker – assistant engineer 
 Todd Sholar – assistant engineer 
 Carlos Grier – mastering 
 Denny Purcell – mastering 
 Norma Jean Owen – album coordinator 
 Virginia Team – art direction, design 
 Jerry Joyner – logo design 
 Empire Studio – photography
 Mixed at Sound Emporium (Nashville, Tennessee).
 Mastered at Georgetown Masters (Nashville, Tennessee).

Chart performance

References and external links

[ Somewhere in the Night] at Allmusic

1987 albums
Capitol Records albums
Sawyer Brown albums
Albums produced by Ron Chancey